Ryan Hopper (born 13 November 1993) is an English footballer who played as a midfielder for Accrington Stanley in Football League Two.

Career
Hopper was born in Manchester, England. He started his career in the youth team of Oldham Athletic but joined Accrington Stanley in May 2010 on a two-year scholarship. He made his Stanley debut on 27 March 2012, in a 2–0 home defeat to Oxford United, coming on as a substitute for Charlie Barnett. On 16 August 2012, he joined Conference North side Droylsden on a three-month loan.

In December 2012 he joined Mossley and later had spells at New Mills, Winsford United and Droylsden.

References

External links

1993 births
Living people
English footballers
Footballers from Manchester
Association football midfielders
Accrington Stanley F.C. players
Droylsden F.C. players
English Football League players
Mossley A.F.C. players
New Mills A.F.C. players
Winsford United F.C. players